Alfred Boulton (1879 – 29 January 1916) was an English footballer who played in the Football League for Blackpool as a right back. He also played for Accrington Stanley and Kirkham and also served as secretary at the latter club.

Personal life 
Boulton was married with two children and worked as a plumber and painter. On 11 September 1914, a month after Britain's entry into the First World War, Boulton enlisted as a private in the Loyal North Lancashire Regiment. He arrived in France in September 1915 and by 11 January 1916, he had been promoted through the ranks to lance sergeant. 18 days later, Boulton was "killed by a stray bullet" and was buried at Gunners Farm Military Cemetery in Hainaut, Belgium.

References

English footballers
English Football League players
Blackpool F.C. players
1879 births
1916 deaths
People from Kirkham, Lancashire
Association football fullbacks
British Army personnel of World War I
British military personnel killed in World War I
Loyal Regiment soldiers
Accrington Stanley F.C. (1891) players